The 2001 Chinese Jia-A League season is the eighth season of professional association football and the 40th top-tier overall league season in China. The league started on March 11 and ended on December 16, 2001 with Dalian Shide retaining the championship.

Promotion and relegation
Teams promoted from 2000 Jia-B League
Shaanxi Guoli
August 1st

Teams relegated after end of 2000 Jia-A League
Xiamen Xiaxin
Jilin Aodong

Overview
The season would see Dalian Shide continue their dominance within the league and saw them win their sixth league title. On the other end of the table Shenyang Ginde would gain the fewest points in Chinese league history, although because it was an expansion season they avoided relegation. Also the Asian Club Championship was rebranded as the AFC Champions League and would now allow two Chinese teams to enter the competition.

League standings

See also
Chinese Jia-A League
Chinese Super League
Chinese Football Association Jia League
Chinese Football Association Yi League
Chinese FA Cup
Chinese Football Association
Football in China
List of football records in China
Chinese clubs in the AFC Champions League

References
China - List of final tables (RSSSF)

Chinese Jia-A League seasons
1
China
China
2001 establishments in China